Dennis Novikov was the defending champion but lost in the semifinals to James McGee.

McGee won the title after defeating Ernesto Escobedo 1–6, 6–1, 6–4 in the final.

Seeds

Draw

Finals

Top half

Bottom half

References
 Main Draw
 Qualifying Draw

Cary Challenger - Singles
2016 Singles